Albert Mark Galaburda (born 20 July 1948 Santiago, Chile) is a cognitive and behavioral neurologist with a special focus on the biologic bases of developmental cognitive disorders. He is the Emily Fisher Landau Professor of Neurology and Neuroscience at Harvard Medical School, the Director of the Office for Diversity, Inclusion, and Career Advancement at Beth Israel Deaconess Medical Center, Boston, and Co-director of the Harvard University Interfaculty Initiative on Mind Brain and Behavior, together with psychologist Alfonso Caramazza. He is best known for his development of the Geschwind–Galaburda hypothesis, which helps explain differences in cognitive abilities on the basis of sex hormones and immunological characteristics and their relationship to lateralization of brain function, as well as for his pioneering studies on the biological foundations of developmental dyslexia. Other work includes the anatomical organization of the auditory cortex in the brains of monkeys and humans and the neuroanatomical and neurodevelopmental bases of brain laterality and asymmetry. He attended the Six-Year Liberal Arts-Medicine Program at Boston University School of Medicine, graduating with an AB-MD degree in 1971, and completed a residency in Internal Medicine and a residency in Neurology at Boston City Hospital, now Boston Medical Center. He was trained in Medicine under Norman Levinsky and in Neurology under Norman Geschwind. He has published numerous scientific articles and books in the field of cognitive neurology, with a focus on learning disabilities and attention disorders, especially in adults.

In October 2017, he received The Dyslexia Foundation's Einstein Award, which honors an individual who is not dyslexic, but has made significant contributions to increasing our understanding of dyslexia and improving the lives of individuals with dyslexia. Other awards include the Pattison Prize in Neuroscience, Scientist of the Year from the Association for Children with Learning Disabilities, the Neuronal Plasticity Prize from the IPSEN Foundation of France, the Harold Amos Faculty Diversity Award from Harvard Medical School, and the Lifetime Achievement Award in Behavioral Neurology from the American Academy of Neurology.

References

1948 births
Living people
Chilean neurologists
People from Santiago
Boston University School of Medicine alumni
Harvard Medical School faculty